Loreggia is a comune (municipality) in the Province of Padua in the Italian region Veneto, located about  northwest of Venice and about  northeast of Padua.

Loreggia borders the following municipalities: Camposampiero, Castelfranco Veneto, Piombino Dese, Resana, San Martino di Lupari, Santa Giustina in Colle.

Twin towns — sister cities
Loreggia is twinned with:

  Borghetto di Borbera, Italy, since 2001

References

Cities and towns in Veneto